Leszek Krowicki (born 9 November 1957 in Gdańsk) is a Polish handball coach who previously coached the Polish women's national team.

References

1957 births
Living people
Polish handball coaches
Handball coaches of international teams
Polish male handball players
Sportspeople from Gdańsk